Cape Liptrap Lighthouse stands upon the rocky cliff top of Cape Liptrap peninsula, on a solitary part of the South Gippsland coastline. The lighthouse warns ships of the rocks in treacherous Bass Strait.

History
The first Cape Liptrap lighthouse was established in 1913. It was a 2.1 metre steel tower with an acetylene light. As a lighthouse keeper was never stationed at Cape Liptrap, it is really the first automatic Commonwealth funded light to be put into service.

The current lighthouse was built in 1951 in cast concrete and is devised in a square shape with flattened edges. The light characteristic is one flash every 12 seconds, emitted from a height of 93.6 m above sea level. The lighthouse was converted to electrical power in 1970.

See also

 List of lighthouses in Australia

References

External links
 Parks Victoria - Parks Victoria is the custodian of a diverse estate of significant parks in Victoria
 Lighthouses of Australia - Lighthouses of Australia Inc.
 

Lighthouses completed in 1913
Lighthouses completed in 1951
Lighthouses in Victoria (Australia)
1913 establishments in Australia